Little Hulton is an electoral ward of Salford, England.  It is represented in Westminster by Barbara Keeley MP for Worsley and Eccles South. A profile of the ward conducted by Salford City Council in 2014 recorded a population of 13,469.

Councillors 
The ward is represented by three councillors:

 Colette Weir (Lab)
 Kate Lewis (Lab)
 Rob Sharpe (Lab)

 indicates seat up for re-election.

Elections in 2010s

May 2019

May 2018

May 2016

May 2015

May 2014

May 2012

May 2011

May 2010

Elections in 2000s

References 

Salford City Council Wards